Jaromír Navrátil (born 20 February 1963) is a Czech former football player. He made two international appearances for the Czech Republic. He made a total of 194 top flight appearances spanning the end of the Czechoslovak First League and the beginning of the Gambrinus liga, scoring 25 goals.

References

External links
 

1963 births
Living people
Czech footballers
Czechoslovak footballers
Czech Republic international footballers
Czech First League players
FC Zbrojovka Brno players
SK Slavia Prague players
Bohemians 1905 players
FK Hvězda Cheb players
FK Jablonec players
FK Viktoria Žižkov players
Association football midfielders